The Fergana Range (Ferğana tó qırqası/Fergana too kyrkasy, فەرعانا توو قىرقاسى), also known as Ferganskiy Khrebet (Феранский Хребет) Ferganskij Hrebet in Russian, meaning “Ferghana Mountain” in English) is a mountain range of the Tian Shan in the Kyrgyz Republic. The length of the range is 206 km, and the average height is 3600 m above sea level. The highest Mountain is 4893 m ASL.

Geography

The Fergana Range stretches from north-west to south-east, separating the Fergana Valley and the inner Tian Shan. The south-east section of the range is higher. It joins the Torugart Ridge and the Alaykuu Ridge via the Söök Pass (4024 m). The South-west slope is long and low-sloped, the north-east - short and steep. Mountain ranges southwest are denoted by collective term: Pamir-Alay system.

Geology

The Fergana Range is composed of schist, sandstone, limestone, and other sedimentary metamorphic formations ruptured by intrusions of gabbro and diabase.

References

Mountain ranges of Kyrgyzstan
Naryn Region
Osh Region
Jalal-Abad Region
Mountain ranges of the Tian Shan